is a passenger railway station operated by the Takamatsu-Kotohira Electric Railroad in Takamatsu, Kagawa, Japan.  It is operated by the private transportation company Takamatsu-Kotohira Electric Railroad (Kotoden) and is designated station "N06".

Lines
Motoyama Station is a station on the Kotoden Nagao Line and is located 4.5 km from the terminus of the line at Kawaramachi Station and 6.2 kilometers from Takamatsu-Chikkō Station.

Layout
The station consists of one side platform serving single bi-directional track. The station is unattended.

Adjacent stations

History
Motoyama Station opened on April 30, 1912 as a station on the Takamatsu Electric Tramway. On November 1, 1943 it became a station on the Takamatsu-Kotohira Electric Railway.

Surrounding area
Takamatsu Municipal Kyowa Junior High School

Passenger statistics

See also
 List of railway stations in Japan

References

External links

  

Railway stations in Japan opened in 1912
Railway stations in Takamatsu